Khairkhaniidae is an extinct family of Paleozoic fossil molluscs of uncertain position. They are thought to belong to either the Gastropoda or Monoplacophora.
They possess planispiral coiled shells with a columnar microstructure.

2005 taxonomy 
The taxonomy of the Gastropoda by Bouchet & Rocroi, 2005 categorizes Khairkhaniidae within the 
Paleozoic molluscs of uncertain systematic position. This family is unassigned to superfamily. This family has no subfamilies.

2006–2007 taxonomy 
According to the P. Yu. Parkhaev, the Khairkhaniidae is the only family in the order Khairkhaniifomes within the subclass Divasibranchia.

 Class Helcionelloida
 Subclass Divasibranchia Minichev & Starobogatov, 1975
 Order Khairkhaniifomes Parkhaev, 2001
 Family Khairkhaniidae Missarzhevsky, 1989

Genera 
Genera in the family Khairkhaniidae include:
 Khairkhania Missarzhevsky, 1981 - type genus of the family Khairkhaniidae
 Khairkhania rotata Missarzhevsky, 1981
 Barskovia

References 

Helcionelloida